Trencher may refer to:
 Trencher (comics), a comic book series
 Trencher (machine), a digging machine
 Trencher (tableware), a place setting item (originally a flat round of bread)
 Trencher cap, a square academic cap
 Trencher (band), a London-based Casio-core band